Venues NSW is an agency of the Government of New South Wales that owns and operates several sporting facilities across New South Wales, Australia. It was established on 2 March 2012 from the merger of three trusts, namely the Hunter Region Sporting Venues Authority, Parramatta Stadium Trust and Illawarra Venues Authority. Illawarra Venues Authority itself replaced the Wollongong Sportsground Trust in December 2009.

On 1 December 2020, the Sydney Cricket Ground Trust was also merged into Venues NSW.

, Venues NSW's venues are:
Stadium Australia (Accor Stadium)
Western Sydney Stadium (CommBank Stadium)
Newcastle International Sports Centre (McDonald Jones Stadium)
Newcastle Entertainment Centre and Showground 
Sydney Cricket Ground
Sydney Football Stadium (Allianz Stadium)
Wollongong Showground and Wollongong Entertainment Centre (WIN Sports Stadium and Entertainment Centres)

References

Event management companies of Australia
Hospitality companies of Australia
Sports organisations of Australia
Government agencies of New South Wales